Kiyoto Fujinami (藤波清斗 - Fujinami Kiyoto; born April 13, 1995) is a Japanese professional racing driver who currently drives for Kondo Racing in Super GT. He was the 2020 Super GT GT300 Champion.

Career
Following success in karting, Fujinami entered the Formula Challenge Japan in 2012. He scored 2 points in his first season on the way to 13th in the championship. Returning for 2013, he scored 5 pole positions and 3 podiums over the 12 races, ending with 29 points and 6th in the championship. He returned to racing in 2017 in the Super Taikyu Series and also made his debut in Super GT with Mach Syaken MC86 GTNET, scoring 3 points over 6 races with a best finish of 8th at Autopolis. For 2018, Fujinami returned to open wheel cars with B-Max Racing in the Japanese Formula 3 Championship, but over 7 races scored no points finishes. He fared better in the 2019 F3 Asian Championship, with 14 points in 3 races for the team. He also made a 2 race return to Super GT, now with T-Dash driving their Lamborghini Huracan GT3. He won one race and finished with 25 points.

In 2020, Fujinami moved to Kondo Racing and won the Super GT GT300 class championship in their Nissan GT-R. Winning two races at Twin Ring Motegi and Fuji Speedway, securing a further podium and finishing with 71 points. For 2021, a repeat championship win was not forthcoming with 2nd in the championship, despite winning at Okayama and two further podiums at Sugo and Motegi.

In 2022, he continued racing with team mate Joao Paulo de Oliveira for Kondo Racing, the pair won the opening round at Okayama and led the championship at the half way point of the season.

Racing Record

Career Summary

‡ Teams standings

Complete Super GT Results
(key) (Races in bold indicate pole position) (Races in italics indicate fastest lap)

References 

1995 births
Living people
People from Tokyo
Japanese racing drivers
Super GT drivers
Japanese Formula 3 Championship drivers
F3 Asian Championship drivers
Karting World Championship drivers
Nismo drivers
Formula Challenge Japan drivers
Kondō Racing drivers
B-Max Racing drivers